Donjo Football Club is an African football club based in Cotonou, Benin. They play in the Benin Regional League.

Performance in CAF competitions
CAF Champions League: 1 appearance
2005 CAF Champions League – Preliminary Round

League participations
 Benin Premier League: 2003–2005
 Benin Second Division: 2005–?

Notable players
 Mohamed Aoudou

References

External links

Football clubs in Benin